Florenceville is an unincorporated community located in Howard County, Iowa, United States. It is adjacent to the village of Granger, Minnesota.

Geography
Florenceville is located at 43°29'54" North, 92°7'58" West. Florenceville is in the northwest portion of section 10, Albion Township, Howard County. The Iowa-Minnesota state line forms the village's northern border. The Upper Iowa River runs through the village.

The area features a Karst topography. Niagara Cave, located a few miles northeast of the village, is one of the largest caves in the Midwest.

History
Florenceville, platted as Florence, sprang up in the mid-19th century. The population of the community was 58 in 1902, and just 12 in 1925.

Originally, it had a mill, a post office and a general store. Now, mostly houses remain. The village has a Methodist church that closed in the 1960s. An annual reunion service brings former and current residents back together for a Sunday in the summer. The church building is now owned and maintained by the Howard County Historical Society.

Tourism and recreation
The village features a county park popular for softball games. An Amish community thrives in the area and tours of Amish country are available.

References

External links
Howard County

Unincorporated communities in Iowa
Unincorporated communities in Howard County, Iowa